The Third Goryeo–Khitan War was an 11th-century conflict between the Goryeo dynasty of Korea and the Khitan-led Liao dynasty of China near what is now the border between China and North Korea. The Goryeo–Khitan Wars began in 993 with the first campaign and continued with the second campaign.

Background 

In 993, the Liao dynasty under General Xiao Sunning invaded Korea, but retreated after truce negotiations with minister Seo Hui of Goryeo, establishing friendly relations between the two nations. In 1004, the Liao dynasty repulsed the Song dynasty. Subsequently, as part of peace negotiations, the Song dynasty to paid tribute to the Liao emperor.

However, the tension between Goryeo and Liao created another war. In 1009, General Gang Jo of Goryeo led a coup against King Mokjong, killing the king and establishing military rule. In 1010, the alliance was broken and Liao attacked Goryeo for General Gang's treason. Also, the Liao claimed six garrison settlements east of the Yalu River, which Goryeo claimed as its territory in truce negotiations during 993. After suffering numerous and heavy casualties against the Goryeo army, the Liao dynasty managed to defeat Gangjo, who had begun to underestimate them. Despite this defeat, the Goryeo king managed to retain his claim on the six garrison settlements. The Liao forces retreated from the peninsula, with no great prize for the war, but they did not give up their hope of gaining the six garrison settlements and making Goryeo pay tribute.

However, beginning in the summer of 1018, the Liao dynasty constructed a bridge across the Yalu River.

The Invasion and Battle of Kwiju 

In December 1018, 100,000 Liao soldiers under the command of General Xiao Baiya crossed the bridge into Goryeo territory, but were met by an ambush of Goryeo soldiers. King Hyeonjong had heard the news of invasion, and ordered his troops into battle against the Liao invaders. General Gang Gam-chan, who did not have any military experience since he was a government official, became a commander of the Goryeo army of about 208,000 men (the Liao still had advantages, even outnumbered 2 to 1, since Liao troops were mostly mounted while the Koreans were not), and marched toward Yalu River.

Near the Garrison Settlement of Heunghwajin, there was a small stream. General Gang ordered the stream blocked until Liao troops began to cross it, and when the Liao forces were mid-way across, he ordered that the dam be destroyed so that the water would drown much of the Liao army. The damage was great, but the Liao did not abandon their campaign in spite of the challenges represented by defenders and by winter conditions in the northwest. They pushed through to approach Kaesong, the capital, but were defeated by a force led by General Gang Gam Chan.

The Goryeo forces led a massive attack that all but annihilated the Liao army. Barely a few thousand of the Liao troops survived the bitter defeat at Kusong. Many more were captured after surrendering along the river banks. Four years later, Goryeo and the Liao dynasty reached a negotiated peace agreement and established normal relations. The Liao dynasty never again invaded Goryeo.

The surrendered Liao troops were divided up among the provinces of Goryeo and settled in isolated and guarded communities. These prisoners were valued for their skill in hunting, butchering, skinning, and leather tanning. Over the next few centuries, they evolved into the Baekjeong class, who came to form the lowest caste of the Korean people.

Aftermath 
This was the last invasion of Goryeo by the Liao dynasty, as the two reached a peace agreement four years thereafter. Both the Liao dynasty and Goryeo enjoyed a time of peace, and their cultures were at their height. However, as the balance of power on the Liao-Goryeo border shifted, the Jurchens, who lived around the border between the two states, began to expand their power. Finally, in 1115, the Jurchen chieftain Wányán Āgǔdǎ founded the Jin dynasty in Manchuria, and began to attack the Liao dynasty. In 1125, Jin troops captured the Emperor Tianzuo of Liao with help from the Song dynasty, who encouraged the Jin dynasty in the hope of gaining territories they lost to the Liao before. Remnants of the Liao imperial clan fled to Central Asia, where they established the Western Liao dynasty. Many of them were forced to surrender to the Jin dynasty.

See also
Goryeo–Khitan War
First conflict in the Goryeo–Khitan War 
Second conflict in the Goryeo–Khitan War 
Third conflict in the Goryeo–Khitan War
Battle of Gwiju

References

External links 
Koryo and the Khitans

 
 

Goryeo–Khitan War
Wars involving Imperial China
Conflicts in 1018
Conflicts in 1019
11th century in Korea
1018 in Asia
1019 in Asia